The men's high jump event was part of the track and field athletics programme at the 1936 Summer Olympics. The competition was held on August 2, 1936. Forty athletes from 24 nations competed. The maximum number of athletes per nation had been set at 3 since the 1930 Olympic Congress. The final was won by Cornelius Johnson of the United States. It was the nation's ninth victory in the men's high jump. Johnson's fellow Americans Dave Albritton and Delos Thurber took silver and bronze to complete the podium sweep, the second time (after the inaugural Games in 1896) the United States had taken all three medals in the event.

Background

This was the tenth appearance of the event, which is one of 12 athletics events to have been held at every Summer Olympics. The returning jumpers from the 1932 Games were bronze medalist Simeon Toribio of the Philippines (who had also placed fourth in 1928), fourth-place finisher Cornelius Johnson of the United States, and seventh-place finisher Jerzy Pławczyk of Poland. Johnson was the slight favorite over his countryman Dave Albritton; both had jumped 2.07 metres at the U.S. trials to break the world record.

Australia, Austria, Brazil, the Republic of China, Denmark, Iceland, and Yugoslavia each made their debut in the event. The United States appeared for the tenth time, having competed at each edition of the Olympic men's high jump to that point.

Competition format

The competition returned to the two-round format introduced in 1912. There were two distinct rounds of jumping with results cleared between rounds. All jumpers clearing 1.85 metres in the qualifying round advanced to the final (described at the time as separate semifinals and final, though the results were not reset between them). There were jump-offs in the final to resolve ties through sixth place, though the sixth-place jump-off was cancelled "by special order".

Records

These were the standing world and Olympic records (in metres) prior to the 1936 Summer Olympics.

Four men cleared the bar at 2.00 metres, besting the Olympic record: Cornelius Johnson, Dave Albritton, Delos Thurber, and Kalevi Kotkas. Johnson further improved the new record with a successful jump at 2.03 metres. He then tried for the world record, setting the bar at 2.08 metres, but could not achieve that height.

Schedule

The "semifinal" was in effect just the first half of the final.

Results

Qualifying

Final

Details of the jump-off for second through fourth places are unknown. There was supposed to be a jump-off for sixth place, but it "did not take place, by special order."

References

Athletics at the 1936 Summer Olympics
High jump at the Olympics
Men's events at the 1936 Summer Olympics